Tayu may refer to:

 Dasyphyllum diacanthoides, a species of tree in the family Asteraceae
 Tayu (town), a town in Wanghua District, Fushun, Liaoning, People's Republic of China
 Tayu (subdistrict), a subdistrict in Pati Regency, Central Java, Indonesia

See also
 Tayū (disambiguation)